Nielsen v. Preap, No. 16-1363, 586 U.S. ___ (2019), was a United States Supreme Court case related to the detention of legal immigrants with criminal histories. In a 5–4 vote, the Court ruled that the government has the power to detain immigrants at any time that have committed certain crimes that could lead to their deportation, even if those crimes occurred long in the past.

Background

In the specific case, the respondents were legal immigrants in California that had been convicted of criminal charges, each which fell into the class that could lead to deportation, and served their time. They were not detained at their release from serving this criminal sentence, but instead were detained by immigration officials five to eleven years later after being released for serving time on non-criminal charges. With help from the American Civil Liberties Union, the three sued the Department of Homeland Security, arguing that because they were not immediately detained on release from the criminal sentence, Sect. 1226 did not apply to them. The District Court certified their case as a class-action case, represented all immigrants in similar situations, and found for the immigrants, ruling that they could not be held under Section 1226 due to lack of immediate detention. The Ninth Circuit upheld the ruling on appeal. A similar separate class-action case was made in Washington state, under Khoury v. Asher, where both the District and Ninth Circuit reached the same conclusion, that the immigrants could not be detained since they were not detained immediately after release from the criminal offense.

Supreme Court
The Department of Homeland Security petitioned their case to the Supreme Court, who granted certiorari to hear the challenge on both cases, citing that the Ninth Circuit's decision had created a split on the matter among the circuit courts. Oral arguments were heard on October 10, 2018.

The decision was released on March 19, 2019. In the 5–4 decision, the Supreme Court reversed the Ninth Circuit's two rulings and stated that the language of Section 1226 allowed detention at any time after the deportable offense. Justice Samuel Alito, writing for the majority, stated that Congress enacted mandatory detention out of concern that individualized hearings could not be trusted to reveal which deportable criminal aliens who are not detained might continue to engage in crime or fail to appear for their removal hearings, and that allowing for detention long after release reflected the fact that immigration officials are not always notified or available in a timely manner to be at the point of release. Those delays may be caused by unintentional delays, or in some cases, purposely not notified as in the case of some sanctuary cities. However, Alito did acknowledge that this interpretation would end up targeting a wider range of immigrants, including those that have only had minor infractions such as drug offenders and tax cheats, but was necessary to serve the purpose of the law as written by Congress. The other four justices on the conservative wing joined on the majority, though Justice Brett Kavanaugh wrote his own opinion that concurred in part to Alito's, while Justice Clarence Thomas also wrote a concurrence in part, joined by Justice Neil Gorsuch.

The dissenting opinion was delivered by Justice Stephen Breyer, joined by the other three liberal Justices. Breyer cautioned that the majority opinion gave the government a new wide-ranging power; "It is a power to detain persons who committed a minor crime many years before, and it is a power to hold those persons, perhaps for many months, without any opportunity to obtain bail." 

The decision of the Supreme Court was noted to be the second within the last few years to support a strong government stance on immigration, following Trump v. Hawaii (Docket 17-965).

References

External links
 
 Nielsen v. Preap at SCOTUSBlog.com

2019 in United States case law
United States Supreme Court cases
United States Supreme Court cases of the Roberts Court
United States immigration and naturalization case law